Statue of Honor, aka Atatürk Monument,  is a monument situated at Atatürk Park in İlkadım district of Samsun, Turkey dedicated to the landing of Mustafa Kemal Atatürk in Samsun initiating what is later termed the Turkish War of Independence. The monument became a landmark of Samsun.

History
The equestrian statue of Mustafa Kemal Atatürk was commissioned in 1927 by the province governor of Samsun, Kâzım Pasha (İnanç) to the Austrian sculptor Heinrich Krippel, who had won the juried art competition to create the Victory Monument in Ankara depicting equestrian Atatürk. The construction of the bronze statue took place in Vienna from 1928 to 1931. It was mounted on its base in Samsun on October 29, 1931, the Republic Day. The monument was officially inaugurated on January 15, 1932. It is the thirteenth monument to Atatürk and Krippel's fourth artwork in Turkey.

In addition to the honorary to the artist of US$5,500, the construction of the monument cost US$37,000.

The statue's metal casting process was carried out at Vereinigte Metallwerke in Austria.

The 32 pieces were transported in boxes from Hamburg, Germany to Turkey aboard SS Nicea of the Deutsche Levante-Linie arriving in Samsun on October 15, 1931.

See also
Atatürk monuments and memorials

References

Bibliography

Buildings and structures in Samsun
Statues of Mustafa Kemal Atatürk
Tourist attractions in Samsun
Buildings and structures completed in 1932
Equestrian statues in Turkey
Landmarks in Turkey
İlkadım
Bronze sculptures in Turkey
1932 sculptures
Outdoor sculptures in Turkey